Michel Molinier (born 28 May 1947) is a French former rugby league footballer who played in the 1960s and 1970s.

Playing career
Molinier played for Albi, and then for Saint-Gaudens at club level and also represented France at international level, playing the 1968, 1970, 1972 and 1975 Rugby League World Cups, earning 24 international caps in his overall career>. Outside the game, he was undertaking National service, When playing for Saint-Gaudens and for France, he formed a devastating centre combination with Serge Marsolan,

Honours 

 Rugby league:
 French Championship:
 2 time Champion in: 1969, 1973 (Saint-Gaudens)
 3 times finalist in 1968, 1970, 1971 (Saint-Gaudens)

References 

1943 births
Living people
Place of birth missing (living people)
Rugby league centres
French rugby league players
Racing Club Albi XIII players
Saint-Gaudens Bears players
France national rugby league team players